The Golden Bell Award for Best Host in a Variety Show is one of the categories of the competition for the Taiwanese television production, Golden Bell Awards. It has been awarded since 1980.

Award winners

1980s

1990s

2000s

2010s

2020s

References

Host in a Variety Show, Best
Golden Bell Awards, Best Host in a Variety Show